Con Express is a 2002 direct-to-video action film with a political edge, starring by Arnold Vosloo, Sean Patrick Flanery, and Tim Thomerson. It was written by Paul A. Birkett and Terry Cunningham and directed by Cunningham. The movie uses film footage from Runaway Train (1985) and Cliffhanger (1993).

Plot
US Customs agent Alex Brooks uncovers the plot of Russian arms dealers who planned to smuggle nerve gas into the U.S. In order to avoid publicity, the boss of the small customs station in Alaska decides that the dangerous barrels should be sent to a safe compound by train. Meanwhile, a Russian General turned terrorist who is responsible for the smuggling, Simeonov, is being delivered via plane to Washington until a group of his henchmen rescue him. Brooks and the Russian agent Natalya are the only people capable of stopping Simeonov and his group of terrorists from keeping control of the train carrying the deadly nerve gas.

Cast
 Sean Patrick Flanery as Agent Alex Brooks
 Arnold Vosloo as General Anton Simeonov
 Ursula Karven as Agent Natalya
 Eyal Podell as Rudy
 David Lea as Mironov
 Joel West as Zednik
 Tim Thomerson as Bill Barnes
 Ed Cameron as Leon
 Michael Kagan as Commissioner Dunn
 J. Patrick McCormack as Agent Rowe (as John Patrick McCormack)
 Rodney Eastman as Ricky
 Chato as Sanchez
 Michael Flynn as Jeffreys
 Frank Gerrish as Bruno
 Alisa Harris as Lola
 Stevie Johnson as Jensen
 Sean Marble as Jesse
 Steve O'Neill as Colonel Bennett
 Dave Shipp as Razvan
 Scott Subiono as O'Shea
 Lance C. Williams as Carl

Reception
Comeuppance Reviews gave it three stars and stated: "This is one of the last movies produced by PM entertainment. It looks like they spared no expense (except the stock footage of Runaway Train, 1985). The action scenes are well-shot. The stand-out is the gunfight in the cabin. Flanery, Karven, and Vosloo put in good performances for the silly material."

Robert Pardi from TV Guide gave the film two out of five stars and wrote: "The stunt crew earn their pay in this action-packed exercise in unorthodox heroics. Unfortunately, the excitement is undermined by a screenplay that crosscuts between hopped-up flashbacks to colorless present-day scenes."

References

External links
 

2002 films
American action films
Artisan Entertainment films
CineTel Films films
2002 action films
2000s English-language films
2000s American films